Mookajjiya Kanasugalu may refer to:

 Mookajjiya Kanasugalu (novel), a 1968 Kannada novel by K. Shivaram Karanth
 Mookajjiya Kanasugalu (film), a Kannada film based on the novel